Paratrygon is a genus of cartilaginous fish in the family Potamotrygonidae.

Species 
There are currently 3 species:
Paratrygon aiereba (Müller & Henle, 1841)
Paratrygon orinocensis Loboda, Lasso, Rosa & De Carvalho, 2021
Paratrygon parvaspina Loboda, Lasso, Rosa & De Carvalho, 2021

References 

Potamotrygonidae
Ray genera
Freshwater fish genera